This list includes films and television shows about, or photographed (partially or completely) in Pennsylvania.

Films

Adams County
 Gettysburg

Allegheny County (Pittsburgh)

 The Avengers
 A Visit to Santa
 Creepshow
 Day of the Dead
 The Dark Knight Rises
 Dear Zachary: A Letter to a Son About His Father
 The Deer Hunter
 Flashdance
 Happiest Season
 The Road
 The Silence of the Lambs
 Unstoppable
 Zack and Miri Make A Porno

Armstrong County
 The Avengers

Berks County
 Rabbit, Run
 The Last Airbender

Blair County
 Unstoppable

Bedford County 
 The Road

Bucks County
 Lady in the Water
 Signs
 The Last Airbender 
 The Station Agent
 'Til Death

Carbon County

 The Molly Maguires

Centre County
 Unstoppable
 The Thomas Crown Affair

Chester County
 The Benefactor
 The Blob
 The Lovely Bones
 Marley & Me
 The Village

Dauphin County
 Another Harvest Moon
 Girl, Interrupted
 Lucky Numbers
 Major League II

Delaware County
 Clean and Sober
 Creed 2
 Last Call
 Silver Linings Playbook
 Taps
 The Lovely Bones

Erie County
 The Road

Fayette County
 Maria's Lovers

Lackawanna County
 Blue Valentine (film)
 Playing for Keeps
 That Championship Season
 The Trouble with Cali
 The Virtuoso (film)

Lancaster County
 Beloved
 For Richer or Poorer
 Girl, Interrupted
 My Name Is Khan
 Rock School
 The Boys from Brazil
 Witness

Lehigh County

 Bereavement
 Executive Suite
 Glass
 Hairspray
 In Search Of
 Malevolence
 School Ties
 The Farmer Takes a Wife
 The Fields
 The Florentine
 Where Angels Go, Trouble Follows

Luzerne County
 All in Time
 The Miracle of the Bells

Mercer County 
 Tiger Warsaw

Northampton County

 Brutal Massacre
 School Ties
 The Florentine
 The Sopranos (Season 4, Episode 9 titled "Whoever Did This"
 Transformers: Revenge of the Fallen

Wayne County
 Blue Valentine (film)
 Playing for Keeps
 Wet Hot American Summer

Westmoreland County
 Mars Attacks!
 My Girl
 Night of the Living Dead

Philadelphia and other locations 

Alexander Hamilton (1931)
Sons of Liberty (1939)
The Old Maid (1939)
The Philadelphia Story (1940)
Pride of the Marines (1945)
Angels in the Outfield (1951)
The Blob (1958)
Night of the Living Dead (1968)
The Crazies (also released as Codename: Trixie) (1973)
Rocky (1976) - series
Slap Shot (1977)
Dawn of the Dead (1978)
The Deer Hunter (1978)
Martin (1978)
Blow Out (1981)
All the Right Moves (1983)
Flashdance (1983)
Trading Places (1983)
Day of the Dead (1985)
The In Crowd (1987)
Mannequin (1987)
Clean and Sober (1988)
Hairspray (1988)
Tiger Warsaw (1988)
Downtown (1990)
Lorenzo's Oil (1991)
The Silence of the Lambs (1991)
Bob Roberts (1992)
 Hoffa (1992)
School Ties (1992)
Waterland (1992)
Groundhog Day (1993)
Philadelphia (1993)
Striking Distance (1993)
Houseguest (1995)
Sudden Death (1995)
Twelve Monkeys (1995)
Fallen (1996)
Kingpin (1996)
The Long Kiss Goodnight (1996)
That Thing You Do! (1996)
Inspector Gadget (1999)
8MM (1999)
Dogma (1999)
The Sixth Sense (1999)
Stigmata (1999)
Wonder Boys (1999)
Unbreakable (2000)
A Wedding for Bella (2001)
The Mothman Prophecies (2002)
Signs (2002)
Haggard: The Movie (2003)
The Italian Job (2003)
Jersey Girl (2004)
National Treasure (2004)
In Her Shoes (2005)
Land of the Dead (2005)
Invincible (2006)
The Mysteries of Pittsburgh (2007)
The Mighty Macs (2008) (a.k.a. "Our Lady of Victory")
Smart People (2008)
The Wrestler (2008)
Zack and Miri Make a Porno (2008)
Adventureland (2009)
Law Abiding Citizen (2009)
New York (2009)
Minghags (2009)
The Road (2009)
Transformers: Revenge of the Fallen (2009)
How Do You Know (2010)
She's Out of My League (2010)
Stake Land (2010)
My Name Is Khan (2010)
Unstoppable (2010)
Abduction (2011)
Bloodlust Zombies (2011)
Jack Reacher (2012)
Silver Linings Playbook (2012)
The A.R.K. Report (2013)
Split (2016)

Television

Allentown
 16 and Pregnant
 All Worked Up
 Forensic Files
 Kitchen Nightmares
 Medical Detectives 
 Restaurant: Impossible
 The X-Files (Season 3 episode "Nisei" and Season 4 episode "Memento mori")
 The Simple Life

Philadelphia
All My Children
Alpha Girls
Amen
American Dreams
American Exorcist
Angie
Boy Meets World
The Class
Cold Case
Fat Albert and the Cosby Kids
The Goldbergs
Hack
How to Get Away with Murder
It's Always Sunny in Philadelphia
Little Bill
One Life to Live
Philly
Postcards From Buster
Pretty Little Liars
Queer Eye (Season 5)
The Real World: Philadelphia
Strong Medicine
Thirtysomething

Pittsburgh

American Rust
The Chair
Dance Moms
Justified (pilot)
Mr. Belvedere
Sullivan & Son
This Is Us

See also
Harrisburg in film and television
List of films shot in the Lehigh Valley
List of films shot in Pittsburgh
List of television shows shot in Pittsburgh

References

Films shot in Pennsylvania
Lists of films by setting
Lists of films shot in the United States
Lists of television series by setting